Poor Baby is a 1915 American silent comedy film starring Raymond McKee and featuring Oliver Hardy in a bit role.

Cast
 Raymond McKee as Pete, a tramp
 Lucille Allen as Mrs. Smith
 Lou Gorey as Mrs. Jones
 Leonora Van Benschoten as Margy, her baby
 Guido Colucci as Paul Jones
 Alice Grey as Servant girl
 Harry Eytinge as The Sheriff
 Andy Clark as Tommy (as Andrew J. Clark)
 Caroline Rankin as Matilda Jenkins
 Oliver Hardy as Matilda's sweetheart (as O.N. Hardy)

See also
 List of American films of 1915
 Oliver Hardy filmography

References

External links

1915 films
American silent short films
American black-and-white films
1915 comedy films
1915 short films
Silent American comedy films
American comedy short films
1910s American films